Ward Green is a part of Worsbrough, which itself is in the Metropolitan Borough of Barnsley, in the county of South Yorkshire, England.

External links

Geography of Barnsley